Miguélez is a surname. Notable people with the surname include:

Dani Miguélez (born 1985), Spanish director of photography
David Miguélez (born 1981), Spanish footballer
Irene Miguélez (born 2004), Spanish footballer
Paulino Miguélez (born 1999), Spanish footballer
Rosa Miguélez (born 1953), Spanish politician

Patronymic surnames
Spanish-language surnames
Surnames from given names